Kalyanamam Kalyanam may refer to:

 Kalyanamam Kalyanam (film)
 Kalyanamam Kalyanam (TV series)